"Code" is a song by American rappers Offset and Moneybagg Yo, released on August 26, 2022. It was produced by Money Musik, ARJI and Veyis.

Composition
The song has an uptempo beat, over which Offset raps in a staccato delivery and Auto-Tuned vocals, while Moneybagg Yo performs in a brooding tone. Lyrically, the song centers on them being ahead of their time and criticizing "counterfeit" rappers.

Music video
A music video was released alongside the single. Directed by Claire Arnold, it stars American model Bella Hadid, showing her and the rappers wearing Balenciaga clothing and jewelry. Offset and Moneybagg Yo appear in a white background and in a blue-lit studio. Hadid poses and does planks inside a lighted wall box, first wearing a rhinestone bikini with boots and black gloves, before adding a neon green fake fur coat and black hoodie to her outfit. Later, she wears a white faux fur coat and black sunglasses during a runway walk.

Live performances
On September 7, 2022, Offset performed a medley of "Code" and "54321" on The Tonight Show Starring Jimmy Fallon.

Charts

References

2022 singles
2022 songs
Offset (rapper) songs
Moneybagg Yo songs
Songs written by Offset (rapper)
Motown singles